Devon Bostick (born November 13, 1991) is a Canadian actor. He played Rodrick Heffley in the first three Diary of a Wimpy Kid films, starred in the Atom Egoyan-directed film Adoration (2008) and portrayed Jasper Jordan on the dystopian science fiction television series The 100 from 2014 to 2017.

Life and career 

Bostick was born in Toronto, Ontario. His mother, Stephanie Gorin, is a casting director in Toronto, who works on stage and screen and his father, Joe Bostick, is an actor as well as a film fight coordinator.

He is of British and Norwegian descent. Devon began acting when in grade five. He is a graduate of the Etobicoke School of the Arts in Toronto.

He has had roles in the television series Degrassi: The Next Generation, Flashpoint and in the film Citizen Duane, and appeared in the series premiere of Rookie Blue. His film work has included roles in Godsend, Fugitive Pieces and The Stone Angel.

In Adoration (2008), he played Simon, a boy who being raised by his uncle (played by Scott Speedman) after his parents' death. He also appeared in an online spoof trailer for a hoax movie called "Ice Fortress." He had roles in The Poet, a World War II drama starring Roy Scheider and Colm Feore, Saw VI as Brent and Assassin's Creed: Lineage as Ezio Auditore.

Bostick also played Erica's deceased brother Leo in CBC Television's series Being Erica, and Rodrick Heffley in the movies of Diary of a Wimpy Kid. He played Alan in three episodes of The Marvelous Mrs. Maisel.

Filmography

Film

Television

Music video

References

External links 

 
 

Living people
1991 births
Male actors from Toronto
Musicians from Toronto
Canadian male child actors
Canadian male film actors
Canadian male television actors
Canadian male drummers
20th-century Canadian male actors
21st-century Canadian male actors
21st-century Canadian drummers
21st-century Canadian male musicians